Linguistic diversity index (LDI) may refer to either Greenberg's (language) Diversity Index or the related Index of Linguistic Diversity (ILD) from Terralingua, which measures changes in the underlying LDI over time.

Greenberg's Diversity Index (LDI) is the probability that two people selected from the population at random will have different mother tongues; it therefore ranges from 0 (everyone has the same mother tongue) to 1 (no two people have the same mother tongue).  The ILD measures how the LDI has changed over time; a global ILD of 0.8 indicates a 20% loss of diversity since 1970, but ratios above 1 are possible, and have appeared in regional indexes.

The computation of the diversity index is based on the population of each language as a proportion of the total population.  The index cannot fully account for the vitality of languages.  Also, the distinction between a language and a dialect is fluid and often political. A great number of languages are considered to be dialects of another language by some experts and separate languages by others.  The index does not consider how different the languages are from each other, nor does it account for second language usage; it considers only the total number of distinct languages, and their relative frequency as mother tongues.

Rankings by country

See also
Ethnologue
List of official languages by country and territory
Number of languages by country

Notes and references

Notes

References

External links
Terralingua's Index of Language Diversity is a dead link, but similar information is available from the same site at 
 https://web.archive.org/web/20120822015417/http://www.terralingua.org/linguisticdiversity/ and it appears to be based on the following paper:
 http://scholarspace.manoa.hawaii.edu/bitstream/handle/10125/4474/harmonloh.pdf

Index numbers
Applied linguistics
Language geography